Stridsvagn m/31 (Landsverk L-10) was a Swedish World War II era light tank built by AB Landsverk. It was armed with a 37 mm Bofors gun and a coaxial 6.5mm Ksp m/14-29 machine gun, and was equipped with 8–24 mm armor. The tank had advanced design features such as an all-welded construction and used periscopes for visibility rather than view slits. Only three were built and, despite being highly advanced when World War II broke out, they were dug in as static bunkers.

A prototype of a wheeled version of this tank was also built. It had interchangeable wheels and tracks, which could be changed in 15 minutes.

References

World War II tanks of Sweden
Tanks of the interwar period
Military vehicles introduced in the 1930s